Puzzle Islands is a group of small islands, rocks and reefs at the mouth of Flandres Bay, lying  west of Menier Island off the west coast of Graham Land. First charted by the French Antarctic Expedition under Charcot, 1903–05. So named by the United Kingdom Antarctic Place-Names Committee (UK-APC) in 1958; the group is often hidden by icebergs which come to rest in the surrounding shallow waters.

See also 
 List of Antarctic and sub-Antarctic islands

Islands of Graham Land
Danco Coast